Gunnar Pedersen (born 23 September 1924) was a Danish gymnast. He competed in eight events at the 1952 Summer Olympics.

References

External links
  

1924 births
Possibly living people
Danish male artistic gymnasts
Olympic gymnasts of Denmark
Gymnasts at the 1952 Summer Olympics
Sportspeople from Aarhus